Cathryn Wightman (born 8 July 1978) is an Australian synchronized swimmer who competed in the 2000 Summer Olympics.

References

1978 births
Living people
Australian synchronised swimmers
Olympic synchronised swimmers of Australia
Synchronized swimmers at the 2000 Summer Olympics